Lars Wanhammar (born 19 August 1944) is professor emeritus at Linköping University. He has been a pioneer in Swedish digital signal processing (DSP) since 1981.

Education 
Wanhammar studied at Linköping University, where he graduated with a master's degree in 1970, as an engineer in 1980 and a doctorate in 1981.

Thesis publications 
 An Approach to LSI implementation of wave digital filters, dissertation, 200 pages, 1981. .

Selected works 
 Wanhammar, Lars & Saramäki, Tapio: Digital Filters Using MATLAB. Springer, 2020. ,  (eBook).
 Wanhammar, Lars: Analog Filters using MATLAB. Springer, 2009. .
 Wanhammar, Lars: DSP Integrated Circuits. Academic Press, 1999. .

References 

1944 births
Living people
Swedish electrical engineers
Academic staff of Linköping University
People from Vansbro Municipality
Linköping University alumni